Stewart Alexander (born 1951) is an American politician.

Stewart Alexander may also refer to:

Skip Alexander (1918–1997), American professional golfer
 Stewart Alexander (actor) in Renaissance of the Daleks

See also
Stuart Alexander (disambiguation)
Alexander Stewart (disambiguation)